Spruce Creek Township is a township in Huntingdon County, Pennsylvania, United States. The population was 203 at the 2020 census.

Geography
According to the United States Census Bureau, the township has a total area of 8.2 square miles (21.4 km), of which 8.2 square miles (21.2 km)  is land and 0.1 square mile (0.2 km)  (0.73%) is water.

Demographics

As of the census of 2000, there were 263 people, 117 households, and 76 families residing in the township.  The population density was 32.1 people per square mile (12.4/km).  There were 146 housing units at an average density of 17.8/sq mi (6.9/km).  The racial makeup of the township was 100.00% White.

There were 117 households, out of which 29.9% had children under the age of 18 living with them, 54.7% were married couples living together, 7.7% had a female householder with no husband present, and 34.2% were non-families. 31.6% of all households were made up of individuals, and 11.1% had someone living alone who was 65 years of age or older.  The average household size was 2.25 and the average family size was 2.77.

In the township the population was spread out, with 21.3% under the age of 18, 5.3% from 18 to 24, 27.4% from 25 to 44, 33.8% from 45 to 64, and 12.2% who were 65 years of age or older.  The median age was 43 years. For every 100 females, there were 97.7 males.  For every 100 females age 18 and over, there were 89.9 males.

The median income for a household in the township was $33,750, and the median income for a family was $47,188. Males had a median income of $30,156 versus $26,250 for females. The per capita income for the township was $18,148.  About 5.2% of families and 9.2% of the population were below the poverty line, including 3.4% of those under the age of eighteen and 11.5% of those sixty five or over.

References

Townships in Huntingdon County, Pennsylvania
Townships in Pennsylvania